Ban Dan may refer to several places in Thailand:

 Ban Dan District, Buriram
 Ban Dan, Ban Dan, a subdistrict
 Ban Dan, Aranyaprathet
 Ban Dan, Ban Dan Lan Hoi
 Ban Dan, Uttaradit